The 1999 Estoril Open women's singles was the singles event of the first edition of the WTA Tour Estoril Open; a WTA Tier IV tournament and the most prestigious women's tennis tournament held in Portugal. This tournament was part of the ITF Circuit last year, and it was won by Barbara Schwartz. Schwartz was eliminated in the second round of this year's event.

Katarina Srebotnik won in the final 6–3, 6–1 against Rita Kuti-Kis.

Seeds

Draw

Finals

Top half

Bottom half

Qualifying

Seeds

Qualifiers

Lucky losers

Qualifying draw

First qualifier

Second qualifier

Third qualifier

Fourth qualifier

External links
 1999 Estoril Open Draw

1999 Women's Singles
Estoril Open
Estoril Open